Könüllü (also, Kënyullyu) is a village and municipality in the Shamkir Rayon of Azerbaijan.  It has a population of 4,019.

References 

Populated places in Shamkir District